Santiago do Escoural, also Escoural, is a civil parish in the municipality of Montemor-o-Novo, in the district of Évora, in Portugal. The population in 2011 was 1,335, in an area of 138.70 km2.

The Escoural cave is a couple kilometres from the town. The cave is known for its Paleolithic rock art and burial site.

References

Freguesias of Montemor-o-Novo